Jenny Rissveds (born 6 June 1994) is a Swedish cross-country mountainbike rider. She won the gold medal in the under-23 mountainbike race at the World Championships in 2016.

Born in Falun, Rissveds won the gold medal in women's cross country at the 2016 Summer Olympics in Rio de Janeiro.
In March 2017 Rissveds rode the eight-day Absa Cape Epic stage race in South Africa for the first time. Together with manager Thomas Frischknecht they won the Mixed category comfortably after covering the 641 km route.

In July 2017, she was awarded the Victoria Scholarship.

On 11 August 2019, she won her first world cup victory post-her 2016 Summer Olympics gold medal, when winning a World Cup competition in Lenzerheide in Switzerland.

Major results

2013
 2nd  UEC European Under-23 XCO Championships
2015
 3rd  UCI World Under-23 XCO Championships
2016
 1st  Cross-country, Olympic Games
 1st  UCI World Under-23 XCO Championships
 2nd  UEC European Under-23 XCO Championships
2017
 1st  Overall Mixed Cape Epic (with Thomas Frischknecht)
2019
 XCO World Cup
1st Lenzerheide
3rd Val di Sole
2020
 1st  National XCO Championships
2021
 1st  National XCO Championships
 3rd Overall XCO World Cup
2nd Leogang
2nd Les Gets
3rd Lenzerheide
 XCC World Cup
1st Lenzerheide
3rd Nové Město
3rd Les Gets
3rd Snowshoe
2022
 1st  Road race, National Road Championships
 1st  National XCO Championships
 UCI XCC World Cup
1st Lenzerheide
3rd Albstadt
3rd Nové Město
 Internazionali d'Italia Series
1st Capoliveri
 2nd Overall Gracia Orlová
1st Stage 2
 UCI XCO World Cup
2nd Albstadt
2nd Leogang
2nd Lenzerheide
2nd Snowshoe

References

Living people
1994 births
People from Falun
Swedish female cyclists
Cyclists at the 2016 Summer Olympics
Olympic cyclists of Sweden
Olympic gold medalists for Sweden
Olympic medalists in cycling
Medalists at the 2016 Summer Olympics
Cyclists at the 2015 European Games
European Games competitors for Sweden
Cyclists at the 2020 Summer Olympics
Sportspeople from Dalarna County
20th-century Swedish women
21st-century Swedish women